The Georgian S12 route (Georgian: საერთაშორისო მნიშვნელობის გზა ს12, Saertashoriso mnishvnelobis gza S12, road of international importance), also known as Samtredia-Lanchkhuti-Grigoleti, is a  long "road of international importance" within the Georgian road network which branches off the S1 highway in Samtredia and runs to the S2 highway near Grigoleti (Guria). It is part of the main route between Kutaisi and Batumi, bypassing the Black Sea port Poti. Within the European E-road network it is referred to as E692. Most of the S12 is a two-lane road through villages and towns, while a limited part is a motorway since 2020. Upgrading the entire S12 to a four lane motorway is work in progress but experiences severe delays.

Background
The S12 route was divided over three routes within the Soviet road network classification introduced in the early 1980s. Between Samtredia and Sajavakho the road was part of the R-7 route which continued to Ozurgeti (Sajavakho - Ozurgeti is currently the Sh2). After Sajavakho the route of the current S12 continued as R-26 until Supsa, while the remaining 6 km to Grigoleti was numbered R-76. Prior to the 1980s the route was unnumbered as was the case with most Soviet roads.

In 1996 the current Georgian classification system was adopted and the "roads of international importance" (S-)category was introduced. Initially the S12 was recorded as  "S12 Samtredia-Lanchkhuti-Ureki", but in later years the west end of the road moved one kilometer to Grigoleti. The S12 improves long distance connectivity with Ajara and integrates the Guria region into the Georgian highway network.

Upgrade to motorway

After initial surveys and securing financial support since 2009, the S12 is being upgraded to a motorway over its entire length with two lanes in each direction. The European Union supports the project with a European Investment Bank loan and a grant.

The project is divided in four lots and is part of the major East-West Highway project to create an international (east-west) transport corridor through Georgia, connecting Azerbaijan and Armenia with Turkey. The East-West Highway project also includes motorway upgrades of the S1 between Tbilisi and Samtredia, the S2 between Grigoleti and the Turkish border at Sarpi (part motorway, part single carriageway/super-two), the S4 between Rustavi and the Azerbaijani border (motorway), and the S7 to the Armenian border (motorway).

To bypass villages and towns, the S12 highway will be newly built and relocated up to a few km north.

The remaining three lots have an unknown delay, with various degrees of progress. In December 2022 Lot4 opened adding another  motorway to Georgia's highway network.

Delays
As with other major infrastructure projects in Georgia, the S12 upgrade project is plagued by problems with contracted construction companies from China, Italy, Ukraine and Azerbaijan. Contracts for lot 1 and 3 were terminated in 2018 and 2020 respectively. For Lot-1 this was the second time. New tender procedures were started in February 2020 (Lot-3) and August 2021 (Lot-1). Also, problems with obtaining the required land plots, after construction contracts were signed, played part in the delay as well as unexpected land deformation. Lot 3 has become the most problematic, with hardly any work done by the initial contractor and as of May 2022 there is no new contractor.

In May 2022 Georgia's minister of infrastructure updated Parliament on international arbitration cases against contractors which have the primary aim to reclaim millions in prepayments. Cases were initiated against former contractors for Lot-1, Altcom (Ukraine) and Accord (Azerbaijan), and Lot-3, Todini (Italy). According to the Georgian government it won the case against Ukrainian Altcom, which started its work in 2013, and vanished after only 2 kilometer of 11.5 had been laid. The government said it expected Lot-1 to be finished in 2022 by a Georgian company, while Lot-3 was still pending a new contractor. It said Lot-4 would be finished by 2022, with a delay for which it fined Chinese contractor 23rd China Railway Bureau Group. In July 2022 the Georgian government claimed it won the cases against Accord (lot 1) and Todini (lot 3) as well. In July 2022 the resumption of construction of lot-3 was pending the outcome of a tender procedure.

Route

The S12 highway begins as a two lane road in Samtredia at the junction with the S1 highway to Senaki and the Sh204 to Akhalsopeli. For one kilometer the S12 and the S1 to Tbilisi have an overlap until the junction with the S1 motorway. An overpass for the S1 is under construction. The S12 continues its way south next to the Batumi bound railway line and crosses the Rioni river. At Dapnari village the highway turns West, following the Rioni river at the foot of the hills. The road passes through various villages until through traffic gets transferred to the new motorway section at Japana. From here it is  motorway until Lanchkhuti with a  speed limit. At Lanchkhuti traffic exits the motorway and transfers through the village back to the old two lane road. If one is not in a hurry the road is a pleasant and easy drive. It navigates along the foot of the mountains to Grigoleti through green scenery alternated with villages. At Grigoleti the S12 route joins the S2 / E70 highway for Batumi to the south or Poti to the north.

Intersections

References

Roads in Georgia (country)